State of Play is a British television drama series, written by Paul Abbott and directed by David Yates, that was first broadcast on BBC One in 2003. The series tells the story of a newspaper's investigation into the death of a political researcher, and centres on the relationship between the leading journalist, Cal McCaffrey, and his old friend, Stephen Collins, who is a Member of Parliament and the murdered woman's employer. The series is primarily set in London and was produced in-house by the BBC in association with the independent production company Endor Productions. The series stars David Morrissey, John Simm, Kelly Macdonald, Polly Walker, Bill Nighy, and James McAvoy in the main roles.

The series was Abbott's first attempt to write a political thriller, and he initially made the majority of the plot up as he went along. He was prompted to write the series after BBC Head of Drama Jane Tranter asked him whether he would consider writing a piece "bigger" than anything he had written so far in his career. The serial was Abbott's third major writing project for the channel, following Clocking Off and Linda Green. The series was also a major turning point in David Yates' directorial career, as he began to direct various high-profile television projects following his work on the series.

The six-part series was broadcast on BBC One on Sunday evenings at 9:00pm from 18 May to 22 June 2003. Episodes two to five were initially premiered on the digital television station BBC Four at 10:00pm on the nights of the preceding episodes' BBC One broadcast; however episode six was held back for a premiere on BBC One, so as not to allow the final twists to be spoiled for those who did not have access to digital television. In 2004, the series ran in the United States on the BBC's BBC America cable channel. In 2005, the series was released on DVD by BBC Worldwide, in a two-disc set. Episode one features an audio commentary from Abbott and Yates, and episode six a commentary from Yates, producer Hilary Bevan-Jones and editor Mark Day.

The success of the series and its favourable impression on BBC executives led to Abbott being commissioned to write a sequel, before the first series had even been aired. In 2006, however, a second series appeared to have been abandoned, with Abbott telling Mark Lawson on BBC Radio 4's Front Row in November that he "couldn't find a way to make the story work".

Synopsis
While investigating the murder of fifteen-year-old teenager Kelvin Stagg in what appears to be a drug-related killing, journalist Cal McCaffrey of The Herald (John Simm) and his colleagues Della Smith (Kelly Macdonald) and Cameron Foster (Bill Nighy) find a connection with the coincidental death of Sonia Baker, a young researcher for MP Stephen Collins (David Morrissey). As their investigation progresses, they uncover not only a connection between the deaths, but a conspiracy with links to oil industry-backed corruption of high-ranking British government ministers.

Cast
 John Simm as Cal McCaffrey 
 David Morrissey as Stephen Collins MP 
 Kelly Macdonald as Della Smith 
 Bill Nighy as Cameron Foster 
 James McAvoy as Dan Foster 
 Polly Walker as Anne Collins
 Philip Glenister as DCI William Bell
 Marc Warren as Dominic Foy
 James Laurenson as George Fergus MP
 Benedict Wong as Pete Cheng 
 Amelia Bullmore as Helen Preger 
 Deborah Findlay as Greer Thornton
 Tom Burke as Syd Hardy
 Rebecca Ryan as Karen Collins
 Rory McCann as DI Stuart Brown 
 Michael Feast as Andrew Wilson
 Rebekah Staton as Liz Dixon
 Johann Myers as Sonny Stagg
 Maureen Hibbert as Olicia Stagg
 Shauna Macdonald as Sonia Baker
 Christopher Simpson as Adam Greene

Episodes

Reception
Reviewing the first episode for The Guardian newspaper the day after it had aired, Gareth McLean wrote that "...it's bloody magic. The story is gripping, the acting is ace and Paul Abbott's script is outstanding. His ear for dialogue, and for different voices, is exceptional. The exposition is swift, nifty and joyously unclunky. The characters are credible and rounded. If you can count the best dramas of recent years on the fingers of both hands, it's time to grow a new finger." Other newspaper critics were similarly impressed with the opening instalment. In The Times, Paul Hoggart wrote that "Two excellent performances [from Morrissey and Simm] ensure that the relationship has a turbulent dynamism that is credible and engaging." James Walton in The Daily Telegraph was more cautious, feeling that the opening episode had been promising but the serial as a whole still had the potential to go wrong. "At this stage however, the programme is certainly good enough to make me hope not and to ensure that I'll be back next week to find out."

The consensus appeared to be that the serial maintained its quality to the end. Previewing episode four, Jonathan Wright of "The Guide" section in The Guardian described it as "a political conspiracy thriller that's as buttock-clenchingly tense as Edge of Darkness, as cynical about the British political system as House of Cards, and stands comparisons to both." The television critic of The Independent, Tom Sutcliffe, wrote of the final episode: "I'm not sure that a thriller can end in anything other than anti-climax. If it has been good you're sad it's over, and if it ends badly you're quite likely to feel that you've been duped. Paul Abbott's State of Play, which has had me swallowing double doses on a Sunday evening whenever the schedules allowed, left us with the first kind of let-down rather than the second."

Bill Nighy won the British Academy Television Award for Best Actor for his role. The series also won a Peabody Award in 2004 and won BAFTAs for Best Sound (Fiction/Entertainment) and Best Editing (Fiction/Entertainment). It was nominated, but did not win, in the Best Actor category again, for Morrissey; in the Best Drama Serial category; Best Original Television Music and Best Photography and Lighting. It also won major awards from the Royal Television Society, Banff Television Festival, Broadcasting Press Guild, Cologne Conference, Directors Guild of Great Britain, Edgar Awards, and the Monte Carlo TV Festival.

Adaptation

State of Play was adapted into an Americanized feature film that was released in the United States in April 2009. The plot retained substantial similarities to the original six-hour series, retaining the main characters, but with its location changed to Washington, D.C., and with certain aspects condensed and changed in order to fit the two-hour format.

The film was directed by Kevin Macdonald from a screenplay written by Matthew Michael Carnahan, Tony Gilroy, Peter Morgan, and Billy Ray. Ben Affleck, Russell Crowe, Rachel McAdams and Helen Mirren appear in the lead roles. In an April 2009 interview to promote the film, Affleck, who plays Congressman Stephen Collins, said he drew on the experiences of Gary Condit, Eliot Spitzer, and John Edwards while preparing for the role. The film was generally well received, but not as lauded as the series.

References

Television
 Abbott, Paul. The South Bank Show – Paul Abbott. ITV. Sunday 15 May 2005.

External links

State of Play at the Internet Movie Database

State of Play at bbc.co.uk.

2003 British television series debuts
2003 British television series endings
2000s British drama television series
2000s British political television series
BBC television dramas
Edgar Award-winning works
Peabody Award-winning television programs
2000s British television miniseries
British political drama television series
2003 in British politics
2000s British crime television series
English-language television shows
Television shows set in London